Thomas Robert Plough (born 1941) is an American sociologist most notable for having served as president of North Dakota State University and Assumption College.

Plough is a graduate of Michigan State University. He began his career at Alma College, where he rose to serve as dean of students. He moved to the Eisenhower College and later the Rochester Institute of Technology where he was eventually appointed provost.  He also briefly served as acting RIT president in 1991 and again in 1992.  Plough resigned in the wake of the same scandal that led to the early retirement of M. Richard Rose.

Plough assumed the presidency of North Dakota State University in 1995 and moved to Assumption College in 1998. He announced his retirement in August 2006.

References

External links
 

|-

Alma College faculty
Living people
Michigan State University alumni
Presidents of North Dakota State University
People from Traverse City, Michigan
Rochester Institute of Technology administrators
1941 births
Presidents of Assumption University (Worcester)